Sham Asbi (also Romanized as Shām Asbī; also known as Shamaspi) is a village in Balghelu Rural District of the Central District of Ardabil County, Ardabil province, Iran. At the 2006 census, its population was 2,148 in 511 households. The following census in 2011 counted 2,609 people in 734 households. The latest census in 2016 showed a population of 2,817 people in 820 households; it is the largest village in its rural district.

Etymology
The locals of Sham Asbi identify the first part of the village's name with Sham, i.e. "Syria", interpreting it as "a place with Syrian horses". According to Alice Assadoorian in Iran and the Caucasus, the toponym appears to be an old compound, and thus the folk etymology "can hardly be satisfying". Assadoorian notes that the final –ī in the place name alludes to a patronymic formation, which allows for the resconstruction of the Middle Iranian form of the toponym as *Šāmaspīk or *Šāmāspīk, which translates as "a village belonging to (or founded by) *Šāmāsp". The name *Šāmāsp is a familiar personal name, and derives from Old Iranian *S(i)yāmāspa-, i.e. "(a  man)  having  black  or  dark  studs" (compare Avestan Syāvaspi- and Armenian Šawasp). Assadoorian argues that there was "secondary dissimilation of the initial s- to š-".

References 

Ardabil County

Towns and villages in Ardabil County

Populated places in Ardabil Province

Populated places in Ardabil County